"Posse (I Need You On The Floor)" is a song by German band Scooter. It was released on 21 May 2001 as the lead single from their eighth studio album We Bring the Noise!. Following the success of "The Logical Song" and "Nessaja",
it was released in the United Kingdom in November 2002, reaching number 15 on the UK Singles Chart. The song reached the top 10 in Austria, Germany, and Romania and the top 20 in Denmark, Finland, and Sweden.

The song samples "What Time Is Love?" by The KLF, taken from the 1991 album The White Room. The lyrics "I'm bigger, and bolder, and rougher, and tougher, in other words sucker there is no other" is from Human Resource's 1991 song "Dominator".

Track listings
CD single
 "Posse (I Need You On The Floor)" (Radio Version) (3:50)
 "Posse (I Need You On The Floor)" (Extended Version) (6:38)
 "Posse (I Need You On The Floor)" (Tee Bee Mix) (7:00)
 "Posse (I Need You On The Floor)" (Club Mix) (6:39)

UK CD single
 "Posse (I Need You On The Floor)" (UK Radio Edit) (3:47)
 "Posse (I Need You On The Floor)" (N-Trance Edit) (4:12)
 "Posse (I Need You On The Floor)" (UK Extended Version) (5:29)
 "Posse (I Need You On The Floor)" (N-Trance Extended Mix) (6:03)
 "Posse (I Need You On The Floor)" (Video UK Edit) (Multimedia Section)

12-inch single
 "Posse (I Need You On The Floor)" (Extended Version) (6:38)
 "Posse (I Need You On The Floor)" (Tee Bee Mix) (7:00)
 "Posse (I Need You On The Floor)" (Club Mix) (6:39)

Download
 "Posse (I Need You On The Floor)" (Live From Encore) (5:03)
 "Posse (I Need You On The Floor)" (Extended Version) (6:40)
 "Posse (I Need You On The Floor)" (Tee Bee Mix) (7:02)
 "Posse (I Need You On The Floor)" (Club Mix) (6:41)

Charts

Weekly charts

Year-end charts

Release history

References

2001 singles
2001 songs
2002 singles
Scooter (band) songs
Songs written by H.P. Baxxter
Songs written by Jens Thele
Songs written by Rick J. Jordan